Sdr. Nærå Fri- Og Efterskole is a little school located in Årslev in the middle of Funen. The school has around 150 students, and 40 teachers.

External links
 Sdr. Nærå Efterskole 
 Sdr. Nærå Friskole 
 Sdr. Nærå Børnehus 

Schools in Denmark